The following article is a list of characters from the manga series Jujutsu Kaisen by Gege Akutami.

Concept and creation
Regarding the process of character creation, the author Gege Akutami claimed that they must fall within the canons of shōnen manga in order to capture the attention of readers. Yuji is largely inspired by Akutami's older brother, who is the opposite of Akutami, according to the author's own words, as he had succeeded in sports and study. Akutami said that the message of Jujutsu Kaisen is that nobody has the absolute truth, not the "good guys" nor the "bad guys", and if nobody is right, then nobody is wrong either, and that each character acts according to their own ethics. The Sensui arc of YuYu Hakusho inspired Akutami to create evil characters with the goal of eradicating humanity, for whom the readers, nevertheless, would feel a certain empathy. The character of Nobara Kugisaki was written to be the strongest protagonist while Megumi Fushiguro did not stand out too much until the author decided to give him a line where he makes philosophy. Akutami, fearing that the manga would be cancelled, decided to expand the time during which Yuji is dead. The handling of Yoshino led to more regrets to the author about how his story arc was handled.

With Sukuna and Mahito, Akutami wanted to avoid the typical "deep down they are good" idea, stating that they are intrinsically evil beings who like to make humans suffer, but Akutami said that it cannot be proved that they are wrong, adding that Mahito was like Thanos in Avengers: Endgame, as Akutami never felt hatred for him. For some characters, like Panda and Toge Inumaki, Akutami first created their visual aspects, while the character of Satoru Gojo came from an idea, which represents the paroxysm of force. Sukuna was Akutami's first favorite character due to his design being influenced by everything that Akutami had read, but Kento Nanami was the first character properly created and developed by Akutami, making him the author's later favorite character.

Tokyo Prefectural Jujutsu High School

Students

Yuji Itadori

 is an athletic teenager who joins his school's Occult Club to avoid the track team. After finding and opening a box containing a cursed charm resembling a rotting finger, his school is attacked by phantom-like creatures called Curses. To protect his friends, he consumes the rotting finger and becomes possessed by a Curse known as Ryoumen Sukuna. Yuji later joins the Tokyo Prefectural Jujutsu High School under the tutelage of Satoru Gojo, where he is placed under a death sentence, suspended until he consumes all of Sukuna's fingers, after which the execution would be carried out to eliminate Sukuna at the same time. Yuji believes in leading everyone to a proper death and wants to save everyone. Yuji feels responsible for the hundreds of thousands of people Sukuna kills at Shibuya and seeks to stop Kenjaku at all costs.

Megumi Fushiguro

 is a sorcerer studying in the first year at the Tokyo Prefectural Jujutsu High School under the tutelage of Gojo. He meets Yuji when trying to locate a high-grade cursed charm talisman at his high school. Megumi is the one that convinces Satoru to try to save Yuji from his execution after his possession by Sukuna. He uses his curse power to create  out of his own shadows to exorcise Curses. He has been noted to have high potential as a sorcerer by several other powerful people, including Sukuna himself. He was originally going to be sold to the Zenin clan (one of the big three prestigious families of sorcerers), which was stopped by Gojo, and thus Megumi became a sorcerer himself. The head of the Zen'in clan, Naobito suffers grievous injuries fighting Dagon at Shibuya, and names Megumi as the next head of the Zen'in clan before dying. He and Yuji then compete in the Culling Games in order to save his sister Tsumiki. After the truth about his sister is revealed, Sukuna takes the opportunity and possesses Megumi, becoming his new vessel.

Nobara Kugisaki

 is a sorcerer studying in the first year at the Tokyo Prefectural Jujutsu High School under the tutelage of Gojo. Nobara transferred to the college so that she could move from the countryside without any expenses. She meets Yuji and Megumi during her first official mission as a sorcerer. She carries a toolkit consisting of a strawdoll, a weapon hammer and nails as her primary choice of combat. Nobara looks up to a person called Saori who lived in their village and wishes to meet her sometime again. During the chaos at Shibuya on October 31, she ends up severely disfigured by Mahito and her current status is unknown.

Maki Zen'in

 is a second year student at Tokyo Prefectural Jujutsu High School. Along with Toge and Panda, she recruits Megumi and Nobara (and later Yuji) to participate in the Sister School Exchange Event with Kyoto Prefectural Jujutsu High School. Maki comes from a prestigious sorcerer clan and is poised to be the next heir as the head's eldest child, but due to her lack of Cursed Energy, she and her twin sister Mai were demoted to being the clan's servants. She later left the clan to attend Tokyo Prefectural Jujutsu High School and become a Jujutsu Sorcerer. Having no Cursed Energy, Maki requires the use of glasses to see Curses and uses a variety of weapons as Cursed Tools. During the events at Shibuya, Jogo burns her entire body, and she only survives thanks to the Heavenly Pact. After the events at Shibuya, she lays waste to her clan, in order to gain access to their armory containing weapons useful in the fight against Kenjaku, during this ordeal she becomes even more powerful, which comes with her sister, Mai's sacrifice. She joins the Culling Games as a player, and due to her special circumstance, is able to leave and enter barriers. Noritoshi Kamo from Kyoto school soon joins her side in the colony, but they are set upon by the special grade cursed spirit created from Naoya Zen'in, who has arrived to avenge his own death at the hands of Maki and her mother. They engage in fierce battle, during which Maki is significantly injured. She is forced to retreat, in order to heal, as Noritoshi takes it upon himself to hold off Naoya until she can exorcise it, even if it costs his life. During her battle with Naoya's cursed spirit, she is fully awakened, becoming just like Toji Fushiguro.

Toge Inumaki

 is a second year student at Tokyo Prefectural Jujutsu High School who takes part in the Sister School Exchange Event alongside Maki and Panda. Inumaki possesses the Cursed Speech Technique . He keeps his mouth covered and speaks only in various ingredients of rice balls. This is due to his cursed power concentrated in his voice, creating various effects against Curses depending on how he speaks and uses his words. During the Shibuya incident, he is accidentally caught in Sukuna's Domain Expansion and loses an arm.

Panda

 is a second year student at Tokyo Prefectural Jujutsu High School who takes part in the Sister School Exchange Event. Although having an appearance of a giant panda, he is actually a unique type of Cursed Corpse created by Masamichi Yaga, in which not only does Panda have sentience, but grows and matures as he ages. Also unique to him is having three "cores" (the 'heart' of a Cursed Corpse), which he can change back and forth to unlock various abilities. After grieving the death of his creator, Masamichi Yaga, Panda joins the Culling Games with Itadori and Fushiguro in the effort to stop it. Panda engages in a battle with Hajime Kashimo, a resurrected sorcerer from the Heian era, who manages to defeat all two of his cores. Only the interference of Kinji Hakari stops Kashimo from killing Panda.

Yuta Okkotsu

 is the protagonist of Tokyo Metropolitan Curse Technical School (volume 0), which serves as a prequel for the main series. Yuta was initially a cursed victim of Special-Grade, haunted by the spirit of his childhood friend, Rika Orimoto. Satoru Gojo took charge of Yuta's case and enrolled him at Tokyo Prefectural Jujutsu High School, where he befriended Maki Zen'in, Toge Inumaki and Panda. After training with Gojo and the other students, Yuta learns to control his cursed energy and becomes a skilled swordsman. Even after Rika's curse is lifted, Yuta maintains his Special-Grade ranking, so much so that he can beat Suguru Geto, and Gojo has stated that Yuta has the potential to overcome him. Yuta's great power comes from being a descendant of one of the three great sorcerer clans (which makes him a distant relative to Gojo) and is the reason he cursed Rika when he refused her death at a young age. Yuta is still a sophomore at the institute, studying abroad. He later comes back as the executioner of Itadori Yuji after Gojo had been sealed, though the two soon team up afterwards, in order to rid the world of Kenjaku. He enters the Sandai colony of the Culling Games in order to protect the civilians from sorcerers and gain information on Kenjaku. He successfully defeats multiple very powerful, reincarnated sorcerers, such as Ishigoori and Uro.

Kinji Hakari
 is a third-year student at Tokyo Jujutsu High who is currently suspended for clashing with authority. While away from the school, Kinji is running a fight club between sorcerers for money. He has been spoken by Gojo as potentially surpassing him along with Yuji and Yuta, and Yuta also states that Hakari is capable of being stronger than him when he is serious. Following Yuta's advice, Megumi and Yuji seek him out to gain his help against Kenjaku, and soon find him at his illegal fight club. Upon hearing that Gojo has been sealed and Yaga was executed, Kinji agrees to help defeat Kenjaku. He later shows up in the Tokyo No. 2 Colony of the Culling Games, in an attempt to recruit French sorcerer and manga artist, Charles Bernard to their battle against Kenjaku. His innate technique allows him to spontaneously create and manipulate Pachinko machine parts, such as sliding doors. By expanding this technique into a domain, Hakari places himself and others inside a Pachinko machine, the appearance of which reflects how close Hakari is to a jackpot. Additionally, his cursed energy is inherently harmful to the touch, making him a particularly dangerous fighter in close combat. Using this technique, he is able to beat the reincarnated sorcerer, Hajime Kashimo after he had gravely injured Panda, forcing him into an alliance.

Kirara Hoshi
 is a third-year student at Tokyo Jujutsu High who is currently suspended for clashing with authority. While away from the school, Kirara has partnered with Kinji while running his fight club. Their cursed technique is Interstellar Flight (Love Rendezvous), a complex technique whose motif is based on the Southern Cross constellation. They agree to Fushiguro and Itadori's request for help, after hearing about everything that transpired at Shibuya. Kirara is currently outside the barriers of the Culling Game serving as the provider of intel for the group.

Faculty and staff

Satoru Gojo

 is a sorcerer working as a teacher at the Tokyo Prefectural Jujutsu High School. He uses his curse power to control the space around him in numerous ways. Even though his title of 'The Strongest' is self-proclaimed, most allies and enemies alike never actually dispute the title and consider him one of the most dangerous people alive. As a result, Satoru is widely respected by sorcerers and greatly influences the sorcery world. He convinces his superiors at the college to keep Yuji Itadori alive until he consumes all of Sukuna's fingers. He teaches Yuji, Megumi Fushiguro, and Nobara Kugisaki. The Special Grade Cursed Spirits ambushed him at Shibuya, and Kenjaku managed to seal him away after he exorcised Hanami.

Kiyotaka Ijichi

 is the assistant principal of Tokyo Prefectural Jujutsu High School. He can create curtains, a technique used to implement a barrier to separate an area from the outside. Nanami revealed that he was once training to be a sorcerer, but for unrevealed reasons, he chose to become a manager instead. He is injured during the events at Shibuya, but Shoko saves him.

Shoko Ieiri

 is a doctor at Tokyo Prefectural Jujutsu High School and former classmate of Satoru and Suguru Geto. She has proven to be quite a valuable resource, being one of the few people capable of healing others with the Reverse Healing Cursed Technique. Shoko is a rather serious and somber person, wants nothing more than to get her job done, and often has to stop or get in the middle of Satoru to make fun of others. She usually examines dead bodies in the school morgue and does not engage in combat, unlike the other sorcerers.

Kento Nanami

 is a Grade 1 Jujutsu Sorcerer, an alumnus of Tokyo Prefectural Jujutsu High School, and one of Yuji's mentors. His personality is a stark contrast to Satoru's, being stoic and serious, whereas the latter is more easygoing. His cursed power allows him to forcibly create weak spots on the target with his weapon, a blunt sword wrapped in cloth. He was killed in the Shibuya incident by his rival, Mahito, after Jogo scorched his body.

Akari Nitta

 is one of the managers working for Jujutsu High School. She was assigned to accompany the first years in their mission to defeat the Yasohachi Bridge curse.

Atsuya Kusakabe

 is a faculty member of Tokyo Jujutsu School. He teaches the second-years at Tokyo Jujutsu School. Although he does not possess an innate technique, he reached the levels of a grade 1 sorcerer using only his katana and excellent swordsmanship. His special move is Batto Sword Drawing (抜刀). It is implied that he is the mentor of Kasumi Miwa as she has the same skillsets.

Masamichi Yaga

 is the Principal of Tokyo Prefectural Jujutsu High School, the creator of Panda, and the teacher of Satoru, Suguru, and Shoko. His cursed technique, allows him to animate and control dolls. Yaga accepts Yuji in the institute only after being convinced that he knows exactly what he is getting into and supports Satoru in opposing the superiors who want Yuji dead. Most of his appearances involve him having to deal with their escapades. After the events that transpire at Shibuya on October 31, the higher-ups hold him responsible for the carnage, and he is sentenced to death, which Gakuganji carries out.

Kyoto Prefectural Jujutsu High School

Students

Aoi Todo

 is a third-year Sorcerer of Kyoto Prefectural Jujutsu High School. He is quite solid in hand-to-hand combat, defeating five Grade 1 Cursed Spirits and 1 Special Grade during an attack in Kyoto. He can apply a flash coating of Cursed Energy to his body for defence. Todo also dislikes anything boring due to his mundane past as a result of his incredible strength. He usually asks his opponent what his type is in women. He believes Itadori Yuji to be his brother and that they went to the same middle school. He also taught Yuji how to control his cursed energy. He helps Itadori fight Mahito during the Shibuya Incident, though he loses an arm, which prevents him from ever using his technique, Boogie Woogie, again.

Mai Zen'in

 is a second-year Sorcerer of Kyoto Prefectural Jujutsu High School. She detests her twin sister Maki after the latter leaves her and their clan to study to become a Jujutsu Sorcerer. Compared to Maki, who possesses no Cursed Energy at all, Mai possesses a Cursed Technique, albeit possessing a low amount of Cursed Energy. An expert markswoman, she primarily uses a revolver infused with Cursed Energy to take out Curses or other Sorcerers. The process exhausts her quickly. After Gojo is sealed at Shibuya, she is fatally wounded by her father and in her last moments used the most of her remaining Cursed Energy to create a replica of Toji Fushiguro's Split Soul Katana, to which she gave to Maki to destroy the Zen'in Clan. The sword also serves as the last connection between the two sisters.

Kasumi Miwa

 is a second year Sorcerer of Kyoto Prefectural Jujutsu High School and Gakuganji's secretary. She is also a fan of Gojo. Coming from an impoverished family, she wishes to become a Jujutsu Sorcerer to provide financial relief to her siblings. She is proficient with a sword, and her Shadow-Style: Simple Domain technique allows her to instinctively strike at anything within 2.21 meters of her radius. She often calls herself "useless Miwa". During the Shibuya Incident, she learns of Muta's actions and subsequent demise at the hands of Mahito, and mourns him after realizing, that she had feelings for him as well. After the Shibuya Incident, she appears at one of the Culling Game colonies.

Kokichi Muta / Mechamaru

 is a second year Sorcerer of Kyoto Prefectural Jujutsu High School. His cursed technique, allows him to manipulate robot-like Cursed Corpses all over the country. His daily life and sorcerer's missions are undertaken by an assortment of Cursed Corpses puppets he uses for combat and communication, each of them named . Secretly, he had a crush on his classmate, Kasumi Miwa. It was revealed that he was the mole working with the cursed spirits Gojo and Utahime suspected. He formed a Binding Vow with Mahito to heal him of his condition, but turned on him and Kenjaku, revealing that he only used the cursed spirit for his ability to heal him and soon proceeds to attack them. Though he managed to push Mahito far, he soon met his end at the cursed spirit's hands. He later redeemed himself posthumously by helping Itadori in the events of the Shibuya Incident.

Momo Nishimiya

 is a third year Sorcerer of Kyoto Prefectural Jujutsu High. She is a Semi-Grade 2 sorcerer, her cursed technique is Tool Manipulation which allows her to telekinetically levitate her broom, similar to those used by witches. Her role is supportive rather than offensive, as she uses her power to scout areas and collects information. As a third-year student, she looks out for her juniors and is especially close friends with Mai Zenin. She becomes a player of the Culling Games and is located in Tokyo Colony No. 2.

Noritoshi Kamo

 is a third-year Semi-Grade 2 Sorcerer of Kyoto Prefectural Jujutsu High. Although he is an illegitimate child, he becomes the next heir of the Kamo clan as he inherits the Blood Manipulation Technique of his clan. His main weapon of choice is a bow, and his arrows are dipped in his blood to control their direction. After the Shibuya Incident, Kenjaku, having resumed his role as the original Noritoshi Kamo, exiles Kamo from his clan, who then joins Maki in one of the Culling Games colonies along with Momo. While patrolling the colony with Maki, the two of them are attacked by the special grade cursed spirit born from Naoya Zen'in and his desire for revenge against Maki. When the spirit manages to wound Maki, Noritoshi takes it upon himself to hold Naoya off until she can heal up and exorcise it, even at the cost of his own life, should it come to it.

Arata Nitta
 is the only first-year student of Kyoto Prefectural Jujutsu High. He is the younger brother of Akari Nitta. His Cursed Technique allows him to prevent injuries from getting worse, though he cannot heal. Unlike Shoko Ieiri, he can only stop bleeding and reduce pain. He is a sorcerer considered of great value that only he and Todo were sent for rescue in Shibuya.

Faculty and staff

Yoshinobu Gakuganji

 is the principal of Kyoto Prefectural Jujutsu High School and one of the elders pushing for Itadori's execution. He uses a guitar to send Cursed Energy by amplifying the melody he plays. After the events that transpire at Shibuya, he executes Masamichi Yaga, whom the elders blamed for the tragedy.

Utahime Iori

 is a Grade 1 Jujutsu Sorcerer and one of the teachers of Kyoto Prefectural Jujutsu High School. While she is usually very polite and reserved, the mere sight of Gojo is enough to make her blood boil, as he often teases her for being weak. Secretly, she works with Gojo to find out who the mole in the school is. Her investigation reveals that Muta was the mole, though he has already been killed.

Other Jujutsu Sorcerers

An alumnus of Jujutsu School. Knowing her technique is weak, she strove to become a powerful sorcerer and was able to become a grade 1 sorcerer for being a capable fighter. Her weapon of choice is a battle-axe. Mei Mei is known to have questionable morals and a materialistic personality, and she only cares about which side has more money which she openly admits.

The younger brother of Mei Mei, whom he greatly admires. As a member of a sorcerer clan, he possesses great skills as a sorcerer even in his young age. Ui Ui is deeply loyal to his sister, allowing himself to be put in dangerous situations for her.

She is one of the four special grade sorcerers and a former Star Plasma Vessel. She was a mentor to Aoi Todo, who she scouted one day while traveling. She aims for a world with no Cursed Spirits, a belief that differs from Jujutsu School. Yuki has a habit of asking men she meets what type of girls they like, a habit Todo adopted. After the Shibuya Incident, she shows up to help, volunteering to guard Master Tengen. Towards the end of the Culling Games, when Kenjaku shows up to absorb Tengen, she and Choso go all-out to force Kenjaku to reveal his own Curse Technique and not rely on Geto's.

An alumnus of Jujutsu School and the protege of Nanami Kento. He is a Grade 2 sorcerer and currently waiting for his promotion to Grade 1. Ino looks up to Nanami as a role model and even got emotional when Nanami relies on him to take care of Itadori and Fushiguro. His innate technique is Auspicious Beasts Summon (来訪瑞獣) which allows him to become a spiritual medium to summon the four Auspicious Beasts - Kaichi, Reiki, Kirin, and Ryu. He is eager to fight to prove his skills but was incapacitated by curse users during the Shibuya Incident.

A student from Tokyo Metropolitan Curse Technical College. He was the only classmate and friend of Kento Nanami during his time as a Jujutsu Student until he was killed in action during a mission in 2007. In contrast to Nanami, he was a bubbly and energetic person. Suguru mentioned that his friendliness could even lead him to danger. Haibara's death was one of the reasons that led Suguru Geto to become a curse user. Haibara appeared once more to Nanami while he was at death's door in Shibuya.

An immortal Jujutsu Sorcerer that remains within the Tombs of the Star Corridor at all times to reinforce the barriers that protect both Jujutsu High locations. Tengen is responsible for preaching the foundation of Jujutsu Sorcerers and spawning religious groups that worship them as their deity. He has no problems with aging, but he must restore his body every five hundred years by merging with a specific human to prevent his technique from making it evolve beyond humanity and into a potentially dangerous state.

Zen'in Clan
The  is one of the Three Big Sorcerer Families, along with the Gojo Clan and the Kamo Clan. It is a clan known to have problematic ideals, only recognizing family members with powerful techniques, otherwise they are rejected and not even considered as human beings. For this reason, Toji Fushiguro and Maki Zen'in left the clan due to their lack of Cursed Energy.

The head of the Zen'in family and a Special Grade 1 sorcerer possessing the Projection Sorcery technique. Naobito is always seen drinking, even in serious situations like in Shibuya. Though when it comes to a fight, he is ecstatic especially facing a powerful opponent. He was confident in his abilities enough to fight the Special Grade curse, Dagon - even while they were trapped in his Domain Expansion. He died after the events of the Shibuya Incident making Megumi Fushiguro the current head of the clan.

The youngest son of Naobito Zen'in, he inherited the Procestion Sorcery technique, believing himself to be the rightful heir to the clan. When it was revealed that Megumi Fushiguro was to be the new head, Naoya was determined to kill him. Naoya is the embodiment of Zen'in Clan's ideals. He is arrogant and apathetic. Naoya looks down on the weak, and only sees women as objects - he was particularly harassing his cousin, Maki Zen'in when they were younger, believing her attitude to be inappropriate for a woman. He began hunting Itadori, when he was wanted for execution, but relented once Okkotsu arrived to execute Itadori. Later, he was defeated by Maki during her onslaught and finished off by her non-sorcerer mother which led Naoya to become a Vengeful Cursed Spirit.

Not being able to accept his defeat against Maki, the Vengeful Spirit of Naoya entered the Culling Games as a player. His curse technique is proven to be more powerful with his new body and is now capable of flight. Later on, he used his Domain Expansion, Time Cell Moon Palace  (時胞月宮殿) to finish off Maki, but to her special circumstances, was unaffected by it and was defeated by her once more. 

The father of Mai and Maki Zen'in, and the brother of Naobito Zen'in. He believed he could have become the head of the Zen'in Clan if it weren't for his daughters. He sees them as failures for not having talent in Jujutsu and even does not hesitate to attack his own children fatally. With his Blazing Courage Technique, he is a Special Grade-1 sorcerer that allows his katana to burst into flames for deadlier attacks. An enraged Maki later killed him in their second duel to avenge the death of her twin sister.

A large and brutish man and a member of the clan's elite unit of Jujutsu Sorcerers, the Hei, led by Naoya Zen'in. He is a Special Grade 1 sorcerer with great capabilities in sorcery, unlike his little brother Toji Fushiguro, who has zero cursed energy. His technique allows him to manifest a barrage of giant fists to accompany his punches. He was later killed and decapitated by Maki.

The youngest member of the clan's elite unit of Jujutsu Sorcerers, the Hei, led by Naoya Zen'in. He is a Semi-Grade 1 sorcerer. Ranta is known to be respectful and responsible to his fellow Zen'in Clan members. His technique allows him to restrict movement, which he uses to support Jinichi's attacks. He died from the injuries he gained from using his technique in extreme measures.

An old and short man of the clan's elite unit of Jujutsu Sorcerers, the Hei, led by Naoya Zen'in. His innate technique allows him to manipulate the earth and create giant stone arms from the ground. He was easily killed by Maki.

 The captain of the Kukuru unit - a branch lower than the Hei unit where all male clan members with no Innate Technique are obligated to join and undergo intense training to keep up with the rest of the clan who have their own techniques. He and his unit were all killed by Maki.
Ogi's wife
The mother of Mai and Maki Zen'in. As a servant of the Zen'in Clan, she is not shown to speak or even walk alongside the male members of the clan. She expressed her disappointment to Maki, but in her final moments, it is revealed she is glad she gave birth to her daughters.

Curse Users

Kenjaku orchestrated the Shibuya Incident and the Culling Game, to which he plans on recreating the Heian Era, the Golden Age of Sorcery, in modern Japan. At the beginning of the series, he appears as the deceased Suguru Geto - which many have believed he was resurrected at first. In reality, Kenjaku is a mysterious ancient sorcerer who had taken over the bodies of many sorcerers in many eras, among them being the ancestor Noritoshi Kamo whose body he used to make the Death Paintings and currently has possessed Geto's dead body. Kenjaku worked along with Mahito's group to carry out his plans. However, he does not see them as allies and had ulterior motives using Geto's Cursed Manipulation Technique which he acquired in possession of his body. Kenjaku's 'true form' is a brain with a mouth where he transfers himself into different hosts of his choice and they can be recognized with the horizontal stitches around their head. During the Culling Games, he approaches Sasaki, Itadori's friend and classmate at his previous school and thanks her for taking care of "his" son. A while after the start of the Culling Games, he resumes his identity as Noritoshi Kamo and head of the clan, exiling the current Noritoshi. He then goes to attempt to absorb Tengen, but Yuki Tsukumo and Choso go all out in a fight to force him into submission.

A mysterious curse user aligned with Kenjaku that has existed for a thousand years. Their cursed user allows them to materialize and manipulate ice. Their abilities are powerful enough to freeze a large group of people and is even capable of using Reverse Curse Technique to heal themselves. Although a human, Sukuna regards them as an ally because of their delicious cooking.

A weak curse user whose technique is based on luck, who was brought on the mission to the Sister School Event as a distraction by Uraume, and later to murder Jujutsu School Managers in Shibuya, starting with stabbing Ijichi. During Sukuna's rampage, he accidentally runs into his Domain Expansion and is killed. 

A curse user who is keen on murdering people and using their body parts for his handicrafts and tools. Uraume hired him for their mission during the Goodwill Event. He has a workshop of many powerful cursed tools. Dragon-Bone is considered his masterpiece and is currently in possession of Maki Zenin. His limbs are destroyed by Gojo and he is captured and interrogated by the Jujutsu School Managers.
  
A pair of old curse users hired by Kenjaku to raise curtains in Shibuya. They feared Gojo, claiming their freedom was taken from them because of his Six Eyes and Limitless Technique. Ogami possesses Séance Technique, and uses her grandson as a vessel while Awasaka has the Inverse Technique.

A powerful curse user that Kenjaku hired in Shibuya. He patrolled the subway and ran into Mei Mei's group but was ultimately defeated by her.
  
 Two soldiers from a faction of Curse Users called 'Q'. They were tasked in assassinating Rika Amanai to stop her from merging with Tengen but were ultimately defeated by Gojo and Geto.

Suguru Geto's Group

Suguru Geto

 is a Special Grade Jujutsu Sorcerer and former classmate of Satoru and Shoko, and thus a student of Yaga. His curse technique allows him to absorb and control natural curses and use them for combat. During his time at Tokyo Prefectural Jujutsu High, Geto was an excellent student, as well as considered to be the strongest along with Gojo. After the Star Plasma Vessel mission failed, he developed a strong hatred for people without magical powers to the point of wanting to exterminate them all to give life to a world of sorcerers only, an act that, according to him, it would prevent the creation of cursed spirits and consequently end the cycle in which all sorcerers are trapped. He is later confirmed to have been killed by Gojo at the end of Volume 0, leaving his body free to be possessed by the ancient evil sorcerer, Kenjaku, who would then take on Geto's identity.

Nanako Hasaba

 is a young cursed user that Geto took under his wing. After seeing the twin girls being mistreated and locked in a cage by their village, Geto's hatred for non-sorcerers grew stronger as he went mad and cursed all of the villagers. Her technique allows her to manipulate photographed subjects captured in her phone's camera. She cares deeply for Geto and is extremely angry at Kenjaku for taking over his body. Sukuna kills her in the events of the Shibuya Incident. Her gruesome death, along with many other innocent civilians, traumatized Yuji.

Mimiko Hasaba

 is the twin sister of Nanako. She always carries a cursed doll around, which is involved with her technique. She cares deeply for Geto and is extremely angry at Kenjaku for taking over his body. Sukuna kills her in the events of the Shibuya Incident. Her gruesome death, along with many other innocent civilians, traumatized Yuji.

Miguel

 is a curse user from Africa. He was an ally of Geto, but after his death, the group parted ways. Gojo currently recruits Miguel to train Yuta Okkotsu in Africa. His weapon of choice is the special-grade cursed tool that belonged to his clan, the Black Rope. It nullifies the effects of any Cursed Technique.

Larue

 is a curse user of unknown capabilities. He was an ally of Geto, but after his death the group parted ways. Larue is currently working alongside Yuki Tsukumo.

Toshihisa Negi
 is a curse user of unknown capabilities. He was an ally of Geto, but after his death the group parted ways. He is currently working alongside Kenjaku to preserve Geto's will.

Manami Suda

 is a curse user of unknown capabilities. She was an ally of Geto, but after his death the group parted ways. She is currently working alongside Kenjaku to preserve Geto's will.

Cursed Spirits

Ryomen Sukuna

 is a high-grade demon curse, considered the undisputed 'King of Curses' due to his raw power and malevolence. According to legend, he was a four-armed demon resembling a human, when in reality, he was the vengeful spirit of a sorcerer from the prime era of jujutsu. Sorcerers of his time could not exorcise him, however, storing his 20 fingers as cursed charms in the hope that they would be destroyed one day. Currently, Sukuna is the "guest" of the body of Yuji Itadori, who agrees to let himself be killed to avoid further massacres. He has expressed notable interest in Megumi Fushiguro's abilities and plans to regain his power and body. Whenever Sukuna possesses Itadori, characteristic tattoos form on Itadori's body and two extra eyes open on Itadori's cheeks. Satoru Gojo claims he can beat a fully-restored Sukuna, but the latter has expressed a desire to kill him, and his power is such that all other Cursed Spirits are attempting to restore him. When Itadori is fed ten of Sukuna's fingers at once at Shibuya, Sukuna comes out and commits genocide at Shibuya. During the Culling Games, Sukuna seizes his opportunity and possesses Megumi's body, becoming his new vessel.

Rika Orimoto

, known as the Queen of Curses, was once a normal young girl that turned into a Special Grade Vengeful Cursed Spirit after dying from a tragic accident to which Yuta witnessed. The two were childhood friends and promised each other they would get married when they got older with a silver band that was once Rika's grandmother's ring. Even as a Curse Spirit, Rika's love for Yuta was still strong enough that she would manifest to protect him from danger. Showing tremendous power, Suguru Geto sought Rika as a target for his Curse Spirit Manipulation Technique as he believes she is the key to forging the world he envisions.

Mahito

 is a high-grade humanoid curse born from human hatred, whose goal is to exterminate the human race. He is sadistic, immature, and loves to play with human emotions, even when his life is in danger. He believes life has no value or meaning; therefore, everyone should do what they want. This mentality seems to stem from Mahito's ability to perceive and manipulate souls, which makes him see the soul (and, by extension, the heart) as nothing more than an object. His cursed power allows him to manipulate the soul of himself and others by changing the body's shape, thus enabling him to transfigure the bodies of his victims by turning them into monsters at his service. During the Shibuya Incident, he murders Kōkichi Muta and Kento Nanami, and severely injuring Nobara Kugisaki and Aoi Todo. At the end of the incident, however, Kenjaku absorbs him through Geto's curse technique.

Jogo

 is a Special Grade Cursed Spirit born from the negative emotions associated with volcanoes. Using his cursed power, he can create mini volcanoes, which generate and control extremely powerful fire eruptions, capable of destroying everything in their path. Jogo has immense pride as a cursed spirit and a passionate hatred of humans, convinced that cursed spirits are the true form of humanity as they represent pure truths of life such as hatred, while human beings feign so many positive emotions that they are false beings that should be exterminated. His pride makes him numb toward humans and casually kills them, but it also leads to overconfidence. Despite warnings that his entire group could not kill Satoru, Jogo attempted to defeat him in a single fight and was completely overwhelmed. During the Shibuya Incident, he tries to convince the rampaging Sukuna to join their ranks. Nevertheless, Sukuna utilizes his own fire-based attacks and effortlessly exterminates the cursed spirit, though not before congratulating him for fighting and dying with dignity.

Dagon
 is an octopus-like Special Grade Cursed Spirit born from the negative emotions associated with the ocean. Out of the four Special Grade Cursed Spirits, Dagon appears to be the weakest and the least hostile - but as it turns out he was only a Cursed Womb. Geto and the Special Grades use his Innate Domain as the meeting grounds for their briefings. He fully developed into a form similar to Cthulhu in Shibuya after eating hundreds of people in the subway. He deeply cares for Hanami, Jogo and Mahito, treating them as family and was enraged when hearing of Hanami's death. His cursed power allows him to manifest water out of his mouth, completely flooding the subways of Shibuya, but what makes him an even deadlier opponent is his Domain Expansion which traps his victims on a tropical beach swarming with carnivorous fish shikigami. He was able to gravely wound two Grade 1 Sorcerers, Naobito Zen'in and Nanami Kento but was later exorcised by an undead Toji Fushiguro.

Hanami

 is a Special Grade Cursed Spirit born of humanity's negative treatment towards the forests - to which Gojo reveals that Hanami may be more closer to a natural spirit than a cursed spirit. He believes humans have gone too long in ruining Earth's environment and wants to allow the planet to shine again without human cruelty. His cursed power allows him to create plants that he can manipulate, including draining their life force and storing it in the flower on his left shoulder as Cursed Energy. During the Shibuya Incident, he is part of the team of Special Grades that ambush Gojo, though Gojo can exorcise him before he can be sealed.

Grasshopper
 is a Cursed Spirit working for Mahito's group and was tasked in guarding the commissioned curtains around Shibuya. It was born from the negative emotions revolving around the grasshopper plague. Yuji encountered the curse while on his way to the Shibuya Station. It was intelligent enough to communicate and follow orders but was out-powered and exorcised by Yuji.

Kuchisaki-Onna
 is an Imaginary Vengeful Spirit born from the fear of the famous urban legend. At some point in time, Suguru Geto was able to capture and use her with his Curse Spirit Manipulation Technique. She was used by Geto to fight against Toji Fushiguro during the Star Plasma Vessel mission but was exorcised after her innate domain to trap the sorcerer killer failed.

Cursed Womb: Death Paintings

A vessel for a cursed relic from 150 years ago. He is the oldest of 9 cursed spirit children born from their human mother. He takes the eldest brother's job very seriously and dearly loves his younger brothers. Once an antagonist working alongside Kenjaku, he later becomes an ally to Yuji, who he sees as one of his little brothers. However, it may be true that Itadori is his half-brother through Kenjaku's various host bodies. He possesses the prized Blood Manipulation Technique of the Kamo Clan, and with his nature as part Cursed Spirit, he utilizes it to his advantage as he does not suffer from blood loss.

 The second brother among the Death Paintings. His innate technique is the Rot Technique (蝕爛腐術). Targets of this technique decompose merely in minutes once they are exposed to the poisonous blood of the Death Paintings. Itadori exorcises him with Kugisaki's help, though he empathizes with the brothers.

 The youngest of the Death Paintings. Like his brothers, his main choice of weapon is his blood which contains toxins. He appears in a more grotesque shape compared to his brothers as Kugisaki mistook him for a Cursed Spirit. Kugisaki exorcises him on the highway after being poisoned by them.

Other characters

He was the grandfather and only guardian of Yuji. In his final moments, he asked his grandson to help people.
  
 (Setsuko)
 (Takeshi)
Yuji's seniors from Sugisawa Third High School. They are members of the Occult Research Club along with Yuji. The club stumbled upon one of Sukuna's fingers which was kept as the school's talisman. Sasaki was able to peel off its seal only for cursed spirits to attack both of them. They were later saved by Megumi and Yuji and Yuji visits them in the hospital. Not long after the start of the Culling Games, Kenjaku approaches Sasaki and thanks her for being friends with his "son".

A young girl who moved to Nobara's village from Tokyo. Nobara greatly admired Saori and was even influenced by her personality. Nobara described her as a kind and beautiful girl, but was ostracized by the village because of her upbringing. She was forced to move back to Tokyo, leaving an upset Nobara behind. Presently, she is seen working in an office setting, wondering what Nobara is doing.

Nobara's childhood friend from her village. They often play Super Smash Bros together in her house. Years later, Nobara left to attend Jujutsu High in Tokyo - while at the train to say their goodbyes, Nobara told Fumi to find her way out of the village. 

A first-year student of Sakutozora High School. A victim of merciless bullying which left him with burn scars on his forehead, Junpei believes that people have no hearts and that humans always wish for malfeasance and downfall of others. He first encounters Curses when he and his bullies were at a local movie theatre, when Mahito appears from the shadows, and kills Junpei's bullies, thereby Junpei following Mahito at the back of the theatre. By then, Junpei was interested in Mahito's beliefs of purifying malevolent humans, but he was manipulated into believing that everyone wished him harm and they should die. He meets Yuji and the two become quick friends, but given Mahito's manipulation, he fights Yuji because of his beliefs. Mahito transfigures Junpei into a monster upon realising Mahito's manipulation, and dies quickly after due to Mahito's "crude" execution.

The mother of Junpei. She was killed by a cursed spirit attracted to the Sukuna's finger that was left in her house by Mahito. Her death led Junpei to become a curse user. 

Better known was Tall Idol Takada-chan or simply Takada-chan. She is a popular Japanese idol. Aoi Todo is one of her biggest fans to the point that she plays a huge role in his decision-making processes in battle. 

Yuko was Yuji's old classmate from Junior High School until she moved to Tokyo. She was a shy and quiet girl who was not confident with her physical appearance, but one day she overheard Yuji talking kindly of her, which made Yuko develop a crush on him. In the present day, she has lost weight and grown taller. When she saw Yuji was also in Tokyo, she asked Nobara about him, believing she has a chance with Yuji now with her new appearance. She later realized she was not so different from the people she did not like when Yuji could still recognize her even with her big change. 

He was the father of Yuji. His fate is currently unknown. Wasuke wanted to tell Yuji about his father in his death bed but Yuji did not wish to hear it.
Kaori
 An unseen woman mentioned by Wasuke Itadori. She is implied to be Jin's wife that passed away.

A former member of the Zenin Clan, he is known as the "Sorcerer Killer" and is the father of Megumi. Like Maki, he was born with a Heavenly Restriction, rendering him unable to use Cursed Techniques. In exchange, he was given immense physical prowess, and his senses reached a point where he could still interact with Cursed Spirits. His lack of Cursed Energy allows him to sneak up on and kill Jujutsu Sorcerers. He defeated Gojo and Geto on their first encounter, bringing Gojo to the brink of death. He is callous and has little regard for his own family, selling Megumi to the Zenin Clan for money and even forgetting his name.
/
A minor character from Gojo's Past Arc. He is a Korean national who contracted Toji Fushiguro to kill the Star Plasma Vessel in 2006. Though he has the ability to see cursed spirits, he is not a sorcerer.

A minor character from Gojo's Past Arc. She is the caretaker of Riko Amanai after her family was killed in an accident. She is mostly a non-combatant, which surprises her opponents as she is also sorcerer with fighting capabilities.

The Star Plasma Vessel that was targeted for assassination by many Curse Users in 2006. She was a young girl fated to become the new vessel for Tengen which she has fully embraced. Her protection was a critical mission assigned to Gojo and Geto. Towards the end, she admits she wanted to live her life more as a normal teenager to Geto instead of merging with Tengen. Moments later, Toji shot her in the head, completing the assassination. The consequences of Amanai's death would emanate in the present day as Tengen, who has not merged with a Star Plasma Vessel which he was supposed to in 2006, has evolved into a non-human that could become an enemy of humanity. These course of events were orchestrated by Kenjaku and have led to the Culling Game.

Culling Game Players

The adopted step-daughter of Toji and the older step-sister of Megumi. She was in a coma as a result of a curse that Kenjaku inflicted. She has recently been awakened and ensnared in the Culling Game, along with many other cursed victims across Japan. Upon entering the games, she reveals herself to be a cursed spirit from over 1,000 years ago known as Yorozu.

A player of the Culling Game. She is a sorcerer that calls herself an 'angel' and has existed for over a thousand years. Her cursed technique can extinguish any cursed technique, making her a valuable ally to rescue Gojo out of the Prison Realm.

He is a failing comedian and is discouraged by his poor performance in a comedy club. Later, he was declared a player of the Culling Game and became Megumi Fushiguro's unexpected ally. His curse technique allows his punchlines to become reality, albeit Takaba himself is not aware of his own abilities. 

A defense lawyer who deems the Japanese justice system as unfair. After losing another case, he realizes his client was going to be ruled guilty from the beginning. With these negative emotions, he awakened his cursed power in the courtroom demanding a retrial. He is currently one of the top player of the Culling Game. After a tiresome fight with Yuji, Higuruma agrees to help them by adding a rule to the game, inspired by the boy. His Curse Technique allows him to summon a shikigami called "Judgeman", whose effects seem to take place only within Hiromi's domain, where he is given all the information about who is inside and acts as a judge to determine the sentence of the target. He has also shown the ability to impose rules on the target, such as taking away his cursed energy from him. For close combat, he summons a hammer that can change in size and be controlled remotely.

A modern sorcerer who recognized Yuji from their hometown, Sendai City. Like other modern sorcerers he was forced to participate in the Culling Game by Kenjaku.

A modern sorcerer with a scorpion tail for hair. She has been a player since the beginning of the game. She uses her charm to trick unsuspecting players into taking them to Reggie. Her cursed technique allows her to manipulate her hair.

A Culling Game player and a sinister sorcerer that Remi works for, whose Curse Technique allows him to summon any object he bought through the receipts he carries on his body. He lead a small group of sorcerers who target new players. He is a sorcerer from the past who has incarnated into a body of the present. Using strategy, he survived the early stages of the game and deduced that Kenjaku will reveal something once only the strongest players are left. He uses Remi to attract potential allies or victims to collect points. This led Megumi to a trap in Shinjuku, where Reggie and his allies ambushed the student. He gets into a gruesome fight with Fushiguro, eventually losing. Afterwards, he provides some information about the game and Kenjaku's plans.

A sorcerer who is in an alliance with Reggie Star in the Culling Game. He has the ability to turn his fingers into sharp claws to attack his opponents. He was later defeated by Megumi Fushiguro much to Reggie Star's dismay as it was a 'waste of points'.

A sorcerer who is in an alliance with Reggie Star in the Culling Game. Hazenoki has mastered the ability to heal oneself using Reverse Curse Technique, a rare skill among sorcerers. He uses this in tandem with his Cursed Technique which allows him to detonate certain parts of his body, such as eyeballs and teeth and create deadly explosions.   
Hanyu  Haba
They are Culling Game players that camp in locations where new players appear as they enter Kenjaku's barrier to kill them while caught off guard. Hanyu and Haba are a couple and both have abilities that give them flight with their aircraft structured hair. Itadori defeats them when he enters the Culling Game arena.
Dhruv Lakdawalla
An ancient sorcerer who once conquered Japan on his own during the Civil War of Wa. He reincarnated in the modern era as a player of the Culling Games in Sendai Colony along with Ryuu Ishigouri, Takako Uro and the cursed spirit, Kurourushi, whom he was competing with for the strongest players within the colony. He was later defeated by Yuta Okkotsu and thus ignited a huge battle among the remaining powerful players. 

 A special grade Cursed Spirit born from people's negative emotions of cockroaches. He was released from Cursed Spirit Manipulation of Suguru Geto's technique under the possession of Kenjaku to become a player of the Culling Game. He terrorizes his victims in the Sendai colony by manipulating a wave of cockroaches to feed on their flesh. He was exorcised by Yuta Okkotsu but an offspring appeared later on that was again defeated by Okkotsu in the battle between Uro Takako and Ryuu Ishigouri. 

An ancient sorcerer from 400 years ago that reincarnated into the modern era as a player for the Culling Game. Ishigouri, along with Takako Uro, Dhruv Lakdawalla and Kurourushi were the most powerful players within the Sendai colony creating a deadlock between the four. Ryuu Ishigouri gained some notoriety by having the highest cursed energy output ever recorded. He has the curse technique to create a huge blast of cursed energy from his hair.

An ancient sorcerer that Kenjaku reincarnated as a player for the Culling Game. Takako, Ishigouri, Dhruv Lakdawalla and Kurourushi were the most powerful players within the Sendai colony, creating a deadlock between the four. In her first life, Takako Uro was the captain of the Sun, Moon, and Stars Squad, a group of assassins affiliated with the Toh. She has the cursed technique that allows her to manipulate the sky.
Charles Bernard
A modern sorcerer and the first opponent Hakari Kinji encounters in Tokyo Colony No.2. He is an 'otaku' of French descent who aspires to be a successful mangaka in Japan but could not handle the criticisms of his work. His curse technique incorporates manga creation and allows him to predict his opponents' movements by 'skipping ahead of panels'.

An ancient sorcerer and the top player of the Culling Game who has killed over 40 people. He later spent his points to add a new rule to the game so he could find Sukuna. After encountering and overpowering Panda in Tokyo Colony No.2, Hakari Kinji joined the fight to his aid. After an exhausting fight, Kinji manages to overwhelm Kashimo and force him into cooperation.

An incarnated swordsman that Kamo and Maki unexpectedly allied with in Sakurajima Colony. Hagane is a lethal fighter with a sword and is able to fight the Vengeful Spirit of Naoya, an opponent Maki was struggling with despite wielding no Cursed Energy. Similarly, he cannot see Cursed Spirits but is able to "see everything else" - this led Maki to ponder what makes her different from both Hagane and Toji.

An incarnated sorcerer that Kamo and Maki unexpectedly allied with in Sakurajima Colony. Miyo is a sumo enthusiast and is visually similar to a Kappa. Despite his eccentric personality, Rokujushi acted as a sincere mentor for Maki (in contrast to Gojo and Kusakabe) and helped her reach her full potential in their brief sumo match.

Light novel characters
Tanabe
 An auxiliary manager from Kyoto Prefectural Jujutsu High School. He oversees the missions handled by the Second Year Students, Mai Zen'in, Kokichi Muta, and Kasumi Miwa. He first appeared in the series' second light novel, Jujutsu Kaisen: Yoake no Ibara Michi.

A character from the series' first light novel, Jujutsu Kaisen: Iku Natsu to Kaeru Aki. Set during Yuji's time in hiding and secret training after being declared dead, Yuji encounters Minato in a park. The boy unknowingly manifested a Cursed Spirit that appears in front of his adoptive parent's home at night. Yuji ultimately defeated it after a lesson from Gojo. 

A character from the second light novel. She is a young girl who looks up to Mai Zen'in after seeing her exorcise a Cursed Spirit. She became a 'Window' for Jujutsu Tech, a person who informs the school of cursed-related activities. She has the ability to see cursed spirits, but does not have the abilities to become a sorcerer.

The antagonist from the second light novel. He is a curse user who has a Curse Words Technique. Similar to the Inumaki clan's Cursed Speech, albeit it is much weaker and requires an amplifier such as a talisman to strengthen its effects. Tsurube was able to use his technique on Nobara, making her believe that he was a talent scout. Tsurube was selling information regarding the Jujutsu High School but was defeated by Nobara after freeing herself from his Cursed Words and using a makeshift straw doll to activate her technique. 
Koizumi
A curse user from the second light novel, working for Tsurube. He was defeated by Inumaki and Nobara.

References

Jujutsu Kaisen